Milica Gardašević (born 28 August 1998) is a Serbian long jumper. She won a gold medal at the 2022 Mediterranean Games. She also won the 2017 European U20 Championships and got a bronze medal at the 2019 European U23 Championships.

Her personal bests in the event are 6.83 metres outdoors (Székesfehérvár 2022) and 6.69 metres indoors (Belgrade 2022).

International competitions

References

1998 births
Living people
Serbian female long jumpers
Sportspeople from Novi Sad
Athletes (track and field) at the 2022 Mediterranean Games
Mediterranean Games gold medalists in athletics
Mediterranean Games gold medalists for Serbia